The 1997 Big 12 Conference women's soccer tournament was the postseason women's soccer tournament for the Big 12 Conference held from November 6 to 9, 1997. The 5-match tournament was held at the Blossom Athletic Center in San Antonio, TX with a combined attendance of 6,469. The 6-team single-elimination tournament consisted of three rounds based on seeding from regular season conference play. The Texas A&M Aggies defeated the Nebraska Cornhuskers in the championship match to win their 1st conference tournament.

Regular Season Standings
Source:

Bracket

Awards

most valuable player
Source:
Offensive MVP – Sharon Pickering – Texas A&M
Defensive MVP – Claire Elliott – Texas A&M

All-Tournament team

References 

 
Big 12 Conference Women's Soccer Tournament